Theodore J.Cox (June 30, 1903 – November 5, 1989) was an American football and basketball player and coach.  He served as the head football coach at River Falls State Normal School—now known as the University of Wisconsin–River Falls—from 1925 to 1926, at Tulane University from 1932 to 1935, and at Oklahoma Agricultural and Mechanical College—now known as Oklahoma State University–Stillwater—from 1936 to 1937, compiling a career college football record of 46–34–3. Cox was also the head basketball coach at River Falls State from 1925 to 1928, tallying a mark of 16–11.

Cox was born in Sault Ste. Marie, Michigan. After playing as a tackle at the University of Minnesota from 1922 to 1924, he was hired as football and basketball coach at River Falls State in 1925.  Cox joined Tulane in 1927 as the coach of their freshmen football players, working under head football coach and fellow Minnesota alumnus, Bernie Bierman. Cox was promoted to coaching Tulane's linemen in 1929, and became the head coach before the 1932 season. He compiled a 28–10–2 record as head coach of the Green Wave. His 1934 team went 10–1, won a share of the Southeastern Conference championship, and defeated the Temple Owls in the Sugar Bowl. In 1935, despite posting a winning record at 6–4, he was fired. From 1936 to 1938, he coached at Oklahoma A&M, and compiled a 7–23 record.

Head coaching record

Football

References

1903 births
1989 deaths
American football tackles
American men's basketball players
Basketball coaches from Michigan
Basketball players from Michigan
LSU Tigers football coaches
Minnesota Golden Gophers football players
Minnesota Golden Gophers men's basketball players
Oklahoma State Cowboys football coaches
Tulane Green Wave football coaches
Wisconsin–River Falls Falcons football coaches
Wisconsin–River Falls Falcons men's basketball coaches
College men's track and field athletes in the United States
People from Sault Ste. Marie, Michigan